Highway 6 is a paved undivided major provincial highway in the Canadian province of Saskatchewan. It runs from Montana Highway 16 at the Canada–US border near the Canada customs port of Regway to Highway 55 near Choiceland. The CanAm Highway comprises Saskatchewan Highways from south to north: SK 35, Sk 39, Sk 6, Sk 3, as well as Sk 2.   of Saskatchewan Highway 6 contribute to the CanAm Highway between Corinne and Melfort.

Major provincial highways that Highway 6 intersects are Highway 18, Highway 13 (Red Coat Trail), Highway 39, Highway 1 (Trans-Canada Highway), Highway 11 (Louis Riel Trail), Highway 99, Highway 22, Highway 15, Highway 16 (Yellowhead Highway), Highway 5, Highway 3, Highway 41, and Highway 55 (Northern Woods and Water Route).

Highway 6 passes through the cities of Regina and Melfort.

Travel route

Canada - United States border to Corinne

Highway 6 begins at the Canada–United States border.  The border crossings are Raymond, Montana on Montana Highway 16 in the United States and at Regway, Saskatchewan on Hwy 6.  Two early name choices for Meyer were Meyersville or Fort Comfort the name of the neighboring North-West Mounted Police (NWMP) post to the north.  Minton, became a hamlet in 1930 and in 1951 Minton incorporated as a village.  The initial stages of the journey are mixed grassland, and the main economy is ranching. This area traversed is the Big Muddy Badlands area of the Missouri Coteau. The terrain of the Missouri Coteau features low hummocky, undulating, rolling hills, potholes, and grasslands. This physiographic region of Saskatchewan is the uplands Missouri Coteau, a part of the Great Plains Province or Alberta Plateau Region which extends across the south east corner of the province of Saskatchewan. There are several unique geographical features. The Big Muddy Valley, The Hole in the Wall Coulee, Roan Mare Coulee are all deep valleys of the area.  The Big Muddy Lake, an alkali lake, could be crossed at the Diamond Crossing was a rise in Big Muddy Lake.  Outlaw gangs such as the Jones-Nelson Gang used this undulating landscape to cross the border and hide out. The Big Muddy Lake itself is as are West Coteau and East Coteau lake.  Between the Canada customs port of Regway, and Minton are several points of interest such as an old schoolhouse, and the historic Ceylon Park Memorial Garden. Gibson Creek is dammed with Ceylon Dam providing water to the village of Ceylon, as well as the Ceylon Regional Park which is located just off Hwy 6. Besides passing ranches, oil and gas wells, agricultural lands producing feed, there are also Pregnant Mare Urine barns along this route. Hwy 6 intersects the Red Coat Trail near Pangman at Ceylon.

Highway 6 section of CanAm Highway begins

Corinne is located at the Hwy 6 and Hwy 39 junction, where the two routes share a short concurrency. It is here that the northern journey of the CanAm Highway continues on Hwy 6. The historic Wood Mountain - FortQu'Appelle Trail is marked with a point of interest marker.

 Hwy 6 reaches Regina, which is the capital of Saskatchewan and is the second largest in the province (after Saskatoon). Regina was previously the headquarters of the North-West Territories, of which today's provinces of Saskatchewan and Alberta originally formed part, and of the District of Assiniboia. The city is situated on a broad, flat, treeless plain. There is an abundance of parks and greenspaces: all of its trees – some 300,000 – shrubs and other plants were hand-planted and Regina's considerable beauty is entirely man-made. As in other prairie cities, American elms were planted in front yards in residential neighbourhoods and on boulevards along major traffic arteries and are the dominant species in the urban forest. The IPSCO Wildlife Park is located off Hwy 6 at Regina. 
Hwy 6 and Hwy 1, the Trans-Canada Hwy, intersect at the Regina Bypass, located just south of Regina, at a partial cloverleaf interchange. As part of the project, the Hwy 1 and Hwy 11 designations were moved from Regina city streets to the Regina Bypass. Hwy 6 continues north to a cloverleaf interchange at Ring Road (the former alignment of Hwy 1) at the south end of Regina, it is one of the first two Saskatchewan interchanges which opened in 1967. Hwy 6 formerly followed Albert Street through the city, although signage now points Hwy 6 to follow Ring Road and bypass the downtown area; however, some maps and remnant signage and still show Hwy 6 as following the former route. North of Victoria Avenue, Hwy 6 shared a concurrency with Hwy 11 (prior to the opening of the Regina Bypass) until the route reaches the north end of the Regina, where the routes rejoins Albert Street. Hwy 11A branches northwest towards Hwy 11 and Saskatoon and Hwy 6 leaves Regina.

The Qu'Appelle River flows east–west across the province, Highway 6 goes through the Qu'Appelle valley north of Regina. A crosswalk was installed at Southey, with overhead lights giving higher visibility to pedestrians crossing Hwy 6 at Assiniboia Avenue. 
 
In the Aspen Parkland ecoregion, deer and other large ungulates are a hazard to traffic, resulting in potential animal or human deaths, especially in the autumn mating months or when deer are searching for feeding grounds in the spring. The defence mechanism of deer in the face of a threat is to freeze. There are over 3,500 deer–auto collisions per year in Saskatchewan. A number of measures have been implemented to increase awareness such as fencing, feeding programs, automobile whistles. Deer mirrors along the edges of highways were installed for reducing deer-vehicle collisions. The Wildlife Warning System is triggered by highway vehicles, setting off lights, sounds and or odours ahead of the approaching vehicle to frighten away animals. A system that detects vehicle was installed in 2002 near Harris to reduce the quantity of mule deer–automobile accidents for a two-year testing period. Another system detects large animals and sets off a warning system to drivers of vehicles, alerting them that an animal is on or near the highway ahead of time.

McNab Regional Park is located south of Watson featuring pool and golf course. Watson is located amid the junction of Hwy 5 and Hwy 6. In this area Hwy 6 is traveling through the boreal-transition ecoregion.  The highway travels east of Lake Charron upon which Lake Charron Regional Park offers camping, fishing, nature trails and snowmobiling trails. Naicam is served by Hwy 6, and Hwy 349. This area is sustained by agriculture, with the ecosystem changing from the rolling parkland to boreal forest. The Barrier river valley, Kipabiskau Regional Park, and Lake Charron Regional Park are nearby features.

Highway 6 section of CanAmHighway ends
Melfort, a city of about 6,000, is located on Hwy 6, Hwy 3, and Sk Hwy 41. The CanAm Highway continues north on Hwy 3. The South Saskatchewan and North Saskatchewan Rivers join together west of the highway. The highway thus crosses the Saskatchewan River. The Fort à la Corne Provincial Park and the confluence of the Saskatchewan River Basin are two major attractions in this area. The rural municipality of Torch River No. 488 is located past the tree line of Saskatchewan. There are several recreational sites in the area such as Scot's Landing on the Saskatchewan River and Carrolls Cove Campground, Pruden's Point at Tobin Lake.

History
In 1999 the asphalt concrete pavement section of Highway 6 north of Raymore was tested with a Cold in-place recycling or “CIR” method to rehabilitate highways. This CIR process is a cost-effective method which recycles the top surface of a road. This pulverized material is mixed with asphalt emulsion and spread and compacted back onto the highway surface. This surface is then recovered with a new seal dependent on traffic volume.

Major intersections
From south to north:

Further reading
 Golden leaves / Minton Homesteading in Surprise Valley. 1980" Book Committee. [S.l.] : Minton "1980" Book Committee, 1980. Minton "1980" Book Committee
 Builders of a great land.Published Ceylon, Sask. : History Committee of R.M. of The Gap # 39, 1980. . 
 Homesteading in Surprise Valley; an autobiographical account of the pioneers in this district, compiled by Alice Henderson and Mrs. Nick Stefan.
 Builders of a great land continues : R.M. of The Gap #39, Ceylon. .
 From the roughbark to the buttes : R.M. Norton, no. 69, villages of Amulet, Forward, Khedive, Moreland and Pangman. R.M. of Norton History Committee. .
 Update 95 : R.M. of Norton #69 : Pangman, Moreland, Khedive, Forward, Amulet. Published Pangman, Sask. : R.M. of Norton History Committee, c1998. .
 Southey seen. Published Southey, SK : [s.n.], 1965. Southey High School.
 From prairie wool to golden grain : Raymore and district, 1904-1979. Published Raymore, Sask. : Raymore and District Historical Society, c1980
 Harvest of memories : Earl Grey and district. Published Earl Grey, SK : Earl Grey History Committee, 2007.  (bound) 1553831764 (bound)
 Longlaketon [microform] / [A.S.R.] Published [S.l. : s.n., 1893?]Institute for Historical Microreproductions, 1981. 1 microfiche (6 fr.)  (Positive copy)
 Seventy five years of rural municipal government / by B.M. Sali. Sali, B. M. Published  [Markinch, Sask.] : Published by Rural Municipality of Cupar No. 218, [1985?].
 Watson, Saskatchewan : photographs and posters Published [Watson, SK : s.n. ; 19—?]
 Fifty years of progress : chiefly the story of the pioneers of the Watson district from 1900-1910 / edited by Ben Putnam .. [et al.] Muenster, Sask. : St. Peter's Press, [1951?]
 A century of progress : Watson and district. Published Watson, Sask. : Watson History Book Committee, c2003. 
 Prairie Rose memories Published Jansen, Sask. : Prairie Rose Historical Society, 1992. 
 Spalding roots and branches Spalding, Sask. : Spalding & District Historical Society, 1981. 
 Gleanings along the way : a history of Naicam, Lac Vert and surrounding districts / [Naicam Heritage Committee] ; cover design by Norah Pederson ; inside liners by Leslie Amundson ; sketches by Crystal Misfeldt. Published Winnipeg, Man. : Inter-Collegiate Press, 1980
 Voices of the past : a history of Melfort and district. Author Ryan, Timothy. Published Melfort : Melfort and District Golden Jubilee Committee, 1955
 Log cabin tales and changing trails : history of Choiceland and district. Published Choiceland, Sask. : Choiceland Historical Society, 1984. 
 Kinistino : the story of a parkland community in central Saskatchewan, in two parts. Published [Kinistino? Sask.] : Kinistino and District Historical Organization, 1980. Armstrong, Jerrold
 R.M. of Willow Creek No. 458 : jubilee year, 1912-1962. Author Kahn, Fannie H. Hoffer. Published Melfort, Sask. : Melfort Journal Press, 1962

References

External links

 
 Can Am Highway Saskatchewan Tourism
  Sask Biz Community Profiles
  Encyclopedia of Saskatchewan
 Sask Biz Norton No. 69
 Sask Biz Caledonia No. 99
 Sask Biz Southey
 Sask Biz Rural Municipality (RM) of Lumsden
 Sask Biz Raymore
 Sask Biz Cupar
 Sask Biz Watson
 Sask Biz Prairie Rose
 Sask Biz Naicam
 Sask Biz Melfort
 Sask Biz Choiceland
 Saskatchewan 1926 Highway Map

006
006
Roads in Regina, Saskatchewan